Capilano may refer to:

Institutions
 Capilano University, North Vancouver
 Capilano RFC, a rugby union club in British Columbia

Landmarks
 Capilano Lake, North Vancouver
 Capilano Mall, North Vancouver
 Capilano River, North Vancouver
 Capilano River Regional Park, North Vancouver
 Capilano Suspension Bridge, North Vancouver

People
 Capilano Herald Extraordinary, a position at the Canadian Heraldic Authority
 Joe Capilano, a Squamish chief

Places
 Capilano, Edmonton
 Capilano Transit Centre, in Edmonton

Political ridings
 Capilano—Howe Sound a federal electoral district
 West Vancouver-Capilano, a provincial electoral district
 Capilano (electoral district), a defunct federal electoral
 Coast—Capilano, a defunct federal electoral district
 North Vancouver-Capilano, a defunct provincial electoral district